Eupterote formosana is a moth in the family Eupterotidae. It was described by Shōnen Matsumura in 1908. It is found in Taiwan.

References

Moths described in 1908
Eupterotinae